Laura Massey (born 1 September 1981) is a British professional racing cyclist who rides for Drops Cycling Team. She took a six-month break from her day job to prepare for the 2016 UCI Road World Championships.

See also
 List of 2016 UCI Women's Teams and riders

References

External links
 

1981 births
Living people
British female cyclists
Place of birth missing (living people)
21st-century British women